WAFY (103.1 FM; "Key 103") is a radio station located in Frederick, Maryland, in the United States. The station currently airs a Hot AC format and is owned by Manning Broadcasting, Inc.

History
The station was founded in 1990 by Barbara Marmet, with the intention of having a community radio station for Frederick. The "Key" branding references Frederick native Francis Scott Key.

Among several applicants for the allocation, the Federal Communications Commission (FCC) gave preference to her because of her local residency and, under an affirmative action program designed to increase minority-owned broadcasters, a woman. This led to a lawsuit by Jerome Lamprecht, one of the competing applicants; in 1992's Lamprecht v. FCC, the D.C. Circuit Court of Appeals held in an opinion written by newly confirmed Supreme Court Justice Clarence Thomas that in the absence of a demonstrable reason, such as encouraging programming diversity, such preference was unconstitutional. Litigation continued until an eventual settlement between Lamprecht and Marmet in 1999.

Marmet sold WAFY to Nassau Broadcasting Partners in 2005. After Nassau went into chapter 11 bankruptcy protection, the station, along with WARK and WWEG in Hagerstown, were purchased by Manning Broadcasting, Inc. in May 2012, with the sale being completed on November 1, 2012 at a price of $6.4 million.

On September 16, 2010 at 9am, Key 103 dropped the "Frederick's Continuous Soft Rock" moniker and began a 20th anniversary retrospective show looking back at the 20 years of the station's personalities, music, and activities.  This retrospective ended at 12 noon with a launch into its current Top 40 format, now positioning as "Key 103, Today’s Hits, Yesterday’s Favorites!"

References

External links
Key 103 website

Frederick County, Maryland
Contemporary hit radio stations in the United States
AFY